The Afram River is a  river in Ghana. Prior to the construction of the Akosombo Dam in the 1960s, the Afram is a principal tributary of the Volta River and today is an equally important tributary of Lake Volta. The river runs roughly in a southwesterly direction. It collects all the drainage of the Kwahu Plateau.

References

Rivers of Ghana
Volta River
Lake Volta